USS Kete (SS-369), a Balao-class submarine, was the only ship of the United States Navy to be named for the kete, the foureye butterflyfish Chaetodon capistratus.  Her keel was laid down by Manitowoc Shipbuilding Company of Manitowoc, Wisconsin.  She was launched on 9 April 1944 sponsored by Mrs. E. S. Hutchinson, and commissioned on 31 July.

Departing Manitowoc 20 August, Kete sailed via New Orleans, Louisiana, to Panama. Arriving 5 September, she trained with SubRon 3 until 28 September; then the new submarine sailed to Pearl Harbor, arriving 15 October, and steamed westward on 31 October for her first war patrol.

Harassed by heavy weather and nonfunctioning bow planes, she sailed 19 November for Saipan, where she arrived 24 November. Despite prolonged periods of heavy 
weather, she made lifeguard patrols off the central Ryukyu Islands from 1 January to 27 January 1945 searching for American fliers downed during air strikes on the Ryukyu Islands. After gathering vital weather data, she sailed to Guam and arrived 30 January for refit.

With Lieutenant Commander Edward Ackerman in command, Kete cleared Guam on 1 March for her second war patrol. Assigned to waters surrounding the Nansei Shoto Chain, she resumed lifeguard duty and gathered weather data for the forthcoming invasion of Okinawa. While patrolling west of Tokara Retto on the night of 9 March and 10 March, she surprised an enemy convoy and torpedoed three marus totaling 6881 tons (the Japanese troop transport Keizan Maru (2116 GRT) and the Japanese army cargo ships Sanka Maru (2495 GRT) and Dokan Maru (2270 GRT)). During the night of 14 March, she attacked a cable-laying ship.

With only three torpedoes remaining, she was ordered to depart the area 20 March, refuel at Midway Island, and proceed to Pearl Harbor for refit. Kete acknowledged these orders 19 March; and, while steaming eastward the following day, she sent in a weather report from a position south of Colnett Strait.  She was neither seen nor heard from again. She was scheduled to arrive Midway by 31 March; when repeated attempts to contact her by radio failed she was reported as presumed lost on 16 April.

Circumstances surrounding her loss remain a mystery. The cause could have been an operational malfunction, a mine explosion, or enemy action.

Some Western sources credit the medium-size Japanese submarine  (type Kaichū) with the sinking of Kete but the only indisputable fact is that this submarine crossed the same area on the day Kete sent a weather report there. Ro-41 was possibly sunk on 23 March 1945, three days after a supposed kill. It is very unlikely the Japanese captain (Lt Honda) would not report such an attack. It is even emphasized by the last radio contact with Ro-41, happening on 22 March 1945 and mentioning just "sighting an enemy destroyer".

Kete received one battle star for World War II service.

References

External links 

On Eternal Patrol: USS Kete
  Kill Record: USS Kete
combinedfleet.com: IJN Submarine RO-41

Balao-class submarines
World War II submarines of the United States
Lost submarines of the United States
Missing submarines of World War II
World War II shipwrecks in the Pacific Ocean
Ships built in Manitowoc, Wisconsin
1944 ships
Warships lost with all hands
Maritime incidents in March 1945